Aframomum leptolepis is a species of plant in the ginger family, Zingiberaceae. It is endemic to Cameroon. It was first described by Karl Moritz Schumann.

References 

leptolepis
Endemic flora of Cameroon
Taxa named by Karl Moritz Schumann